Belli di papà is a 2015 Italian comedy film co-written and directed  by Guido Chiesa and starring Diego Abatantuono.  It is a loose remake of the Mexican comedy film The Noble Family.

Plot 
The wealthy businessman Vincenzo, originally from Apulia, realizes that he is a father too absent, but also that his two sons and 1 daughter are spoiled and unable to support themselves economically. So Vincenzo stages their fraudulent bankruptcy, and runs with their children in Taranto, in his old house. The boys are struggling to settle, but Vincenzo is confident about them and hopes that they will soon find a job in the city, though humble and poor. Meanwhile, an impostor blackmailer, who wants to marry the daughter of Vincenzo, arrives in Puglia, to expose the scam.

Cast 
  
 Diego Abatantuono as  Vincenzo Liuzzi
 Matilde Gioli as  Chiara
     Andrea Pisani as  Matteo
     Francesco Di Raimondo as  Andrea
 Antonio Catania as  Giovanni Guida 
 Francesco Facchinetti as  Loris Dettori Maggi
     Marco Zingaro as  Rocco
     Uccio De Santis as  Luca
     Valeria Perri as  Serena
     Nicolò Senni as  Carlo
 Barbara Tabita as  Anna
     Nicola Nocella as  Ferdinando

See also 
 List of Italian films of 2015

References

External links 

2015 comedy films
Italian comedy films
Films directed by Guido Chiesa
Italian remakes of foreign films
Remakes of Mexican films
2010s Italian films
2010s Italian-language films